Year 1303 (MCCCIII) was a common year starting on Tuesday (link will display the full calendar) of the Julian calendar.

Events

By place

Byzantine Empire 
 September – Emperor Andronikos II (Palaiologos), facing a possible siege of Constantinople by Ottoman-Turkish forces, seeks support from the European kingdoms. He makes Roger de Flor, Italian military adventurer and nobleman, an offer of service. Roger with his fleet and army (some 7,000 men), now known as the Catalan Company, departs from Messina with 36 ships (including 18 galleys), and arrives in Constantinople. He is adopted into the imperial family, Andronikos appoints him as grand duke (megas doux) and commander-in-chief of the Byzantine army and fleet.
 Autumn – Battle of Dimbos: The Byzantine governors (tekfurs) of Prusa, Adranos, Kestel, and Ulubat begin a military campaign against the Ottoman-Turkish forces of Sultan Osman I (or Othman). They attack the Ottoman capital city of Yenişehir and proceed to relieve Nicaea, which is under an Ottoman blockade. Osman musters a 5,000-strong army and defeats the Byzantine forces at a mountain pass near Yenişehir.

Europe 
 April 4 – Battle of Arques: Flemish forces (some 10,000 men) led by William of Jülich (the Younger) defeats a French army at Arques in Flanders. During the battle, the French cavalry (1,600 men) tries to break the Flemish infantry militia formations, but to no avail. Finally, the French withdraw to Saint-Omer, leaving 300 dead behind. Later, William receives a warm reception in Bruges as a liberator in May.
 May 20 – Treaty of Paris: King Philip IV (the Fair) signs a peace treaty with Edward I (Longshanks). According to the terms of the treaty, Gascony is restored to England – as well as the cities of Bordeaux and Bayonne. In return, Edward swears allegiance to Philip as his vassal and agrees that Philipp's daughter, Isabella of France, be married to his son Edward of Caernarfon, until she is old enough.
 August – The 17-year-old King Ferdinand IV (the summoned), supervised by his mother, Queen-Regent María de Molina, signs a peace treaty at Córdoba with Granada for three years. In return, Muhammad III renews his vassalage with Castile and pays the same tribute given as to his father, the late King Sancho IV (the Brave). The strategic port city of Tarifa remains in Castilian hands.

England 
 February 24 – Battle of Roslin: Scottish forces (some 8,000 men) led by John Comyn III (the Red) and Simon Fraser ambush and defeat an English scouting party under John Segrave at Roslin. During the battle, the Scots attack the English camp, capturing Segrave and several other nobles. But a second English brigade manages to rescue Segrave in a pitched battle. Later, the English army is again defeated, according to sources they lose between 28,000 and 30,000 men.
 May – Edward I (Longshanks) resumes his campaign against the Scots, and sets out from Roxburgh with a cavalry force and about 7,000 men. He orders that three pre-fabricated pontoon bridges be built and transported, in a fleet of 27 ships. Edward invades Scotland and during the advance, he burns hamlets and towns, granges and granaries. Meanwhile, Richard Óg de Burgh (the Red Earl) with forces from Ireland capture the castles of Rothesay and Inverkip.
 November 9 – Edward I (Longshanks) spends the winter at Dunfermline Abbey where he plans the attack on Stirling Castle. He stations an army in the field and operations continue throughout the winter. An English force (some 1,000 men) raids and plunder into Lennox as far as Drymen. Meanwhile, Lord John Botetourt raids Galloway in strength, with four bannerets (some 3,000 men).

Levant 
 April 22 – Battle of Marj al-Saffar: Mamluk forces (some 20,000 men) under Sultan Al-Nasir Muhammad defeat a Mongol army and their Armenian allies led by Ghazan Khan, on the plain of Marj al-Saffar. After the battle, Al-Nasir enters Damascus and chases the Mongols as far as Al-Qaryatayn in Syria. He returns to Cairo in triumph through the Bab al-Nasr (or Victory Gate) with chained prisoners of war.

Asia 
 August 26 – Siege of Chittorgarh: Delhi forces led by Sultan Alauddin Khalji capture the massive Chittor Fort in northern India, after an 8-month-long siege. Alauddin orders a general massacre of Chittor's population.  
 Mongol invasion of India: Mongol forces appear outside Delhi and begin the siege of the city. Alauddin Khalji and a Delhi vanguard army return to the capital, while the Delhi garrison resists assaults of the Mongols.
 Autumn – Mongol forces lift the siege of Delhi after two months, they retreat with great plunder and war booty. Meanwhile, Alauddin Khaliji orders to strengthen border fortresses along the Mongol routes to India.

By topic

Education 
 April 20 – Pope Boniface VIII founds the University of Rome with the papal bull In Supremae praeminentia Dignitatis, as a Studium for ecclesiastical studies under his control, making it the first pontifical university.

Geology 
 August 8 – 1303 Crete earthquake: An earthquake destroys the Lighthouse of Alexandria in Egypt, one of the Seven wonders of the World.
 September 25 – 1303 Hongdong earthquake: An earthquake destroys the cities of Taiyuan and Pingyang, some 200,000 people are killed.

Religion 
 September 7 – Boniface VIII is imprisoned by Guillaume de Nogaret, French councillor and advisor, on behalf of Philip IV (the Fair) at his residence in Anagni. During the incident, Gregory Bicskei, archbishop of Esztergom, is killed. Boniface is for three days held in captivity, where he is beaten, tortured and nearly executed.
 October 11 – Boniface VIII dies after a pontificate of 8 years at Anagni. He is succeeded by Benedict XI as the 194th pope of the Catholic Church.
</onlyinclude>

Births 
 May 19 – Saw Zein (or Binnya Ran De), Burmese ruler (d. 1330)
 July 12 – Hugh de Courtenay, English nobleman and knight (d. 1377)
 Bridget of Sweden (or Birgitta), Swedish nun and mystic (d. 1373)
 Catherine II, Latin empress consort, regent and co-ruler (d. 1346)
 Henry Ferrers, English nobleman, constable and knight (d. 1343)
 Hōjō Shigetoki, Japanese nobleman (rensho) and official (d. 1333)
 Marie of Évreux, French noblewoman (House of Capet) (d. 1335)
 Willem IV of Horne, Dutch nobleman, diplomat and knight (d. 1343)

Deaths   
 March 4
 Daniel of Moscow, Russian nobleman and prince (b. 1261)
 Theodora Palaiologina, Byzantine empress consort (b. 1240)
 March 17 – Otto IV, French nobleman and co-ruler (House of Ivrea)
 May 19 – Ivo of Kermartin, French priest, judge and saint (b. 1253)
 July 8 – Procopius of Ustyug, German merchant and wonderworker
 August 8 – Henry of Castile (the Senator), Spanish prince (b. 1230)
 August 9 – Thomas Maule, Scottish nobleman, captain and knight
 August 25 – Ninshō, Japanese monk, disciple and priest (b. 1217)
 September 7 – Gregory Bicskei, Hungarian prelate and archbishop
 October 11 – Boniface VIII, pope of the Catholic Church (b. 1230)
 October 27 – Beatrice of Castile, queen consort of Portugal (b. 1242)
 November 1 – Hugh XIII of Lusignan, French nobleman (b. 1259)
 December 9 – Richard Gravesend, English archdeacon and bishop
 Drakpa Odzer, Tibetan monk, abbot and Imperial Preceptor (b. 1246)
 Elizabeth of Sicily, queen consort of Hungary and Croatia (b. 1261)
 Erik Knudsen Skarsholm, Danish nobleman and knight (b. 1235)
 Hajib Shakarbar, Indian scholar, poet, writer and mystic (b. 1213)
 Ibn Abd al-Malik, Almohad historian, biographer and writer (b. 1237)
 John of St. Amand, French pharmacist and philosopher (b. 1230)
 Otto VI (the Short), German nobleman and co-ruler (b. 1255)

References